Dangu may refer to:

 Dangu, Eure, a commune in the Haute-Normandie region of France
 Dangu people, an ethnic group of northern Australia
 Dangu language, their language
 Dangu, a day of the week in the Pawukon calendar of Bali, Indonesia
 Dangu, a drum used in the music of Northeast China

See also
 Dango (disambiguation)

Language and nationality disambiguation pages